Ischasia cuneiformis is a species of beetle in the family Cerambycidae. It was described by Fisher in 1952.

References

Rhinotragini
Beetles described in 1952